Linda Marigliano (born 1984) is an Australian radio announcer and musician, best known for her work on FBi Radio and Triple J and playing bass guitar in indie rock band teenagersintokyo. She currently resides in Sydney and is of Italian and Chinese Malaysian parentage.

Starting on FBi Radio in 2003, she presented the weekday afternoon shift. Moving to Triple J she hosted the midnight-dawn shift on a casual basis during the week until taking a permanent position in 2007.

In 2007, Linda joined Triple J on a full-time basis and started her role as weekday lunch presenter on Triple J (12-3pm).

6 December 2007, was Linda's last show as lunch presenter. As of 7 January 2008, she joined Scott Dooley to present the afternoon drive shift from 3 pm – 5.30 pm weekdays.

5 December 2008, was Linda's last show with Dools as an afternoon drive presenter.

16 January 2012, Linda begins hosting the Triple J Mon-Fri evening shift, "Good Nights", an all-new show replacing Super Request.

8 January 2018, Linda takes over the Triple J Mon-Fri morning shift from 9am-12pm, "Triple J Mornings", replacing Zan Rowe (who moves to Double J).

Linda left Triple J at the end of 2019 to move across to ABC Television, where she had already hosted shows 'What is Music' and 'The Set'.

References

External links
 Linda Marigliano on Triple J
 Triple J Mornings page on Triple J site

1984 births
FBi Radio presenters
Living people
Triple J announcers
Australian women radio presenters
Australian people of Chinese descent
Australian people of Italian descent
Australian people of Malaysian descent